Alex Lewis (born June 11, 1981) is a former American football linebacker. He was drafted by the Detroit Lions in the fifth round of the 2004 NFL Draft. He played college football at Wisconsin where he currently holds the record for most sacks in a game with 6.5 on October 18, 2003 vs. Purdue

External links
Just Sports Stats

1981 births
Living people
Delran High School alumni
People from Delran Township, New Jersey
Players of American football from New Jersey
Sportspeople from Burlington County, New Jersey
American football linebackers
Wisconsin Badgers football players
Detroit Lions players
Omaha Nighthawks players